Burns Creek, a watercourse of the Manning River catchment, is located in the Northern Tablelands region of New South Wales, Australia.

Course and features
The river descends  over its  course.

See also 

 Rivers of New South Wales
 List of rivers in New South Wales (A-K)
 List of rivers of Australia

References

External links
 

Rivers of New South Wales
Northern Tablelands